John Johnson (1850 – 29 December 1910) was a British trade unionist and Lib-Lab politician.

Trade Unionist
He worked in the mining industry. In 1890 he became Treasurer of the Durham Miners' Association and then in 1897 their Financial Secretary.

Politician
In 1904, following the death of the Gateshead Liberal MP, William Allan, Johnson, though a member of the Independent Labour Party, was selected as Liberal candidate to defend the predominantly mining seat at a by-election. He won the election and joined the Liberal-Labour trade union group, as a miners union sponsored MP.

In 1906 he was re-elected at the General Election.

In 1909, when the Miners Federation of Great Britain affiliated to the Labour party he was required to cross the floor to sit as a Labour MP. He was also required to seek re-election at the next General election as a Labour candidate.

In 1910, he contested the January General Election as a Labour candidate but was opposed by a Liberal candidate, Harold Elverston. Johnson was a supporter of the Miners Eight Hours Act, which brought him opposition from many miners in Gateshead. Johnson finished in third place as the Liberals re-gained the seat.

He died in December 1910 at the age of 60 in Durham, England.

References

External links 
 

British trade unionists
1850 births
1910 deaths
Independent Labour Party MPs
Labour Party (UK) MPs for English constituencies
Liberal-Labour (UK) MPs
Liberal Party (UK) MPs for English constituencies
People from Gateshead
Politicians from Tyne and Wear
Trade unionists from Tyne and Wear
UK MPs 1900–1906
UK MPs 1906–1910